Mariana Harder-Kühnel (born 16 August 1974) is a German politician (AfD). Since 24 October 2017 she has served as member of the Bundestag.

In November 2018, the AfD unsuccessfully nominated Harder-Kühnel for the vacant post of one of the Vice Presidents of the Bundestag.

Harder-Kühnel is married and has three children. She is a practicing Roman Catholic.

References

1974 births
Living people
People from Gelnhausen
University of Giessen alumni
German Roman Catholics
Members of the Bundestag for Hesse
Members of the Bundestag 2021–2025
Members of the Bundestag 2017–2021
Members of the Bundestag for the Alternative for Germany
Female members of the Bundestag
21st-century German women politicians